John Andreassen (born 26 August 1943, in Oslo) is a Norwegian television producer who has been behind a number of TV productions for the Norwegian Broadcasting Corporation. He was in 2000 the country's only teacher of Multi-Camera Production and has taught at Lillehammer University College. He has been with the Norwegian Broadcasting Corporation since 1964.

Andreassen has produced TV programmes including Den store klassefesten, LørDan and Lørdagsredaksjonen.

As well as TV productions, he also produced the opening ceremonies for the 1994 Winter Olympics, the FIS Nordic World Ski Championships 1997 in Trondheim, the opening of Gardermoen in 1998, Eurovision Song Contest in 1986 and the Millennium Show at Rådhusplassen in Oslo.

Awards
In 2008, Andreassen was awarded Gullruten's Course Prize. The European Broadcasting Union described him in 1989 as one of Europe's foremost TV producers.

On 10 Aug. 2013, Andreassen was awarded the King's Medal of Merit for his significance to the development of Norwegian television and TV-entertainment. The Director-General of the Norwegian Broadcasting, Thor Gjermund Eriksen, handed Andreassen the award during a live broadcast of the show Sommeråpent.

References

1943 births
Living people
Norwegian television producers
NRK people
Academic staff of Lillehammer University College